Khazana Jewellery is an organised jewellery retail house in South India. It was founded by Mr. Kishore Kumar Jain, and opened its first professionally managed retail showroom in Cathedral road, Chennai, in 1993. It has since expanded to over 40+ showrooms across India. Khazana Jewellery has contributed ₹10 crore towards fighting the COVID-19 pandemic, this comprises ₹4 crore for Andhra Pradesh and ₹3 crore each for Tamil Nadu and Telangana

Brand ambassadors
Former brand ambassadors for Khazana include Rashmika Mandanna, Tamannaah, Samantha, Jacqueline Fernandez, Hema Malini and Khushbu. Presently Rashmika mandanna is the brand ambassador.

References

Indian brands
Jewellery retailers of India
Companies based in Chennai
1993 establishments in Tamil Nadu
Indian companies established in 1993
Retail companies established in 1993